Jean Chatillon (13 September 1937 – 16 January 2019) was a Canadian composer and music educator.

Early life

Chatillon was born into a family of musicians, in 1937, in Nicolet, Quebec. In 1951 he began to play piano and to compose. At first self-taught, then he undertook serious musical studies with the master Conrad Letendre in Montreal.

Career
In 1969, he founded the Music Section of the University of Quebec at Trois-Rivières and taught there until 1981.  In 1970 he was a founding member of the "Institut de sciences musicales Conrad Letendre", along with Michel Perrault.
  
After his retirement from teaching in 1981, he dedicated himself fully to his art.

Chatillon wrote more than 300 musical and literary works. He is an Associate Composer of the Canadian Music Centre. In 2003, he was appointed Professor Emeritus by the University of Quebec.

In January 2004, he became a founding member of the Delian Society, which is dedicated to the renaissance of tonal music.

Chatillon died on 16 January 2019 in Trois-Rivières.

References

External links
Official website

1937 births
2019 deaths
People from Centre-du-Québec
Canadian male composers
Musicians from Quebec
20th-century Canadian composers
20th-century Canadian male musicians